The 2018 MLS SuperDraft was the nineteenth SuperDraft conducted by Major League Soccer. As customary, the SuperDraft was held in conjunction with the annual United Soccer Coaches convention. The 2018 UCS was held in Philadelphia, Pennsylvania between January 17–21, 2018. Rounds one and two of the SuperDraft were held on January 19, 2018. Rounds three and four of the 2018 SuperDraft were held via a conference call on January 21, 2018.

Format
The SuperDraft format has remained constant throughout its history and closely resembles that of the NFL Draft:

Any expansion teams receive the first picks. Los Angeles FC will enter the league as an expansion team in 2018.
Non-playoff clubs receive the next picks in reverse order of prior season finish.
Teams that made the MLS Cup Playoffs are then ordered by which round of the playoffs they are eliminated.
The winners of the MLS Cup are given the last selection, and the losers the penultimate selection.

Player selection

Round 1 
Any player marked with a * is part of the Generation Adidas program.

Round 1 trades

Round 2 
Any player marked with a * is part of the Generation Adidas program.

Round 2 trades

Round 3

Round 3 trades

Round 4

Round 4 trades

Other 2018 SuperDraft Trade Notes 
 On December 23, 2016, Columbus Crew SC acquired a second-round selection in the 2018 SuperDraft from Atlanta United FC in exchange for the MLS rights to defender Greg Garza. Trade terms stated that if Garza started a minimum of 12 MLS regular-season games in 2017 the SuperDraft pick would be converted to General Allocation Money instead of the SuperDraft pick. Garza met this threshold and Columbus received General Allocation Money.
 On March 30, 2017, Vancouver Whitecaps FC acquired a conditional first-round selection in the 2018 SuperDraft, midfielder Tony Tchani, $225,000 of targeted allocation money, and $75,000 of general allocation money from Columbus Crew SC in exchange for forward Kekuta Manneh. The traded SuperDraft pick was contingent on Columbus signing Manneh to a contract extending beyond the 2017 MLS season and would have been Columbus's natural selection. However, in December 2017 Manneh instead signed with Pachuca of Liga MX. Trade terms also stated that Vancouver would receive additional general allocation money if Manneh is traded by Columbus prior to December 31, 2018 and would have retained a percentage of any future transfer fee if Manneh was transferred outside of MLS.

Notable undrafted players

Homegrown players

Players who signed outside of MLS

Summary

Selections by college athletic conference

 NCAA Division I conferences with no draft picks: Big South, Colonial and Northeast

Schools with multiple draft selections

See also 
 2017 NCAA Division I men's soccer season
 2018 NWSL College Draft

References 

Major League Soccer drafts
SuperDraft
MLS SuperDraft
MLS SuperDraft
Soccer in Pennsylvania
Sports in Philadelphia
Events in Philadelphia
MLS SuperDraft